

South, Little, or New Suli or Senie Lake is a small ephemeral lake in Golmud County, Haixi Prefecture, Qinghai Province, China. It lies in the southwest corner of the Qarhan Playa in the southeast Qaidam Basin. It is part of Qarhan's Bieletan subbasin, located south of Suli Lake and west of Dabiele Lake. It is principally fed from the southwest by the Zaohuo or Little Zaohuo River  Xiǎozàohuǒ Hé) and consists of a  basin which gradually evaporates into three smaller ponds. As part of the Bieletan subbasin, it is rich in lithium chloride.

It takes its name from its position relative to the larger Suli Lake, itself supposedly a transcription of a Mongolian placename derived from the word for "temples" or "sideburns".

See also
 Qarhan Playa & Qaidam Basin
 List of lakes & saltwater lakes of China

References

Citations

Bibliography
 .
 .
 .

External links

Lakes of China
Lakes of Qinghai
Haixi Mongol and Tibetan Autonomous Prefecture